The Satellite Award for Best Supporting Actress in a Motion Picture is one of the Satellite Awards presented annually by the International Press Academy. From 1996 to 2005, two categories were presented for supporting performances by male actors, one for performances in a drama film and other for performances in comedy or musical films. In 2006, both categories were merged into the current category without distinction by genre.

Winners and nominees

Drama (1996–2005)

Musical or Comedy (1996–2005)

Motion Picture

See also
 Academy Award for Best Supporting Actress
 Independent Spirit Award for Best Supporting Female

References

External links
 Official website

Actress - Motion Picture
Film awards for supporting actress